Homebake was an annual Australian rock festival, featuring an all-Australian lineup (with the occasional artist from New Zealand). The festival was first held on 3 January 1996 at Belongil Fields in Byron Bay, on the far north coast of New South Wales. The same year saw a second event held at the grounds of the University of Sydney.

The festival returned in January 1998 as an East Coast event happening in Melbourne, the Gold Coast and Sydney. In December of the same year, it was held again in Sydney this time at the Domain. In late 1999 the event went on the road again, but this time to only the Gold Coast and Sydney. In 2000 the festival reverted to just Sydney, and was held at the Domain every December until 2012.

Tickets for the festival regularly sold out in advance, the fastest sell out was the 2006 event which sold out on the first day of sale, but this was then dwarfed with the 2008 show selling all 20,000 tickets in less than 10 minutes.

The 2007 Homebake took place on Saturday 8 December, once again at The Domain. It was announced that the event would be 18+ for the first time in its history. Despite some protests, Homebake organisers explained on Triple J's ''Hack' program that each year the all ages liquor licence was becoming harder to obtain, and compared to their research showing that attendance for the event by underagers was between 5 and 8% influenced the decision to go 18+.

The last Homebake was held in 2012, and the following year's event was unexpectedly cancelled. The festival has not been held since, and as of now, it is unlikely to be resurrected.

Artists lineups by year

1996

Byron Bay

University of Sydney

1998

January - Sydney, Gold Coast, Melbourne

December - Sydney

1999

Sydney and Gold Coast

2000

2001

2002

2003

2004

2005

2006

2007

2008

2009

Rowland S. Howard was advertised to play but was forced to cancel citing health concerns. Dappled Cities played in his allotted timeslot.

2010

On 25 August 2010, the organisers of Homebake announced the festival would not take place in 2010, and would instead return in 2011. The organisers cited "not being able to have the 'planets align' to a standard we feel appropriate" as a reason for cancelling the festival in 2010.

2011

2012
Event organisers announced that the 2012 Homebake would be a "Global" edition. While the line-up for the event, scheduled for 8 December 2012, is predominantly Australasian, American band Blondie has been selected as the headlining act. Kimbra, Something For Kate, Hilltop Hoods, Sonic Animation, and Birds of Tokyo are some of the other performing artists.

After 2012
The event was cancelled in 2013. Organizers acknowledged that there was a hiatus for 2014. It is unlikely the festival will ever return.

References

External links
Homebake official website
Homebake official Myspace page
Homebake 2011 review "Homebake Festival: Classic Aussie Rockers Still Have the Stuff!" - Rocker Magazine

Rock festivals in Australia
Concert tours
Summer festivals
Recurring events established in 1996